Disambiguation: the Video entitled,  Meet the Blue Hearts  was produced as quoted herein, and this is the correct producer's name however, the referenced video Meet the Blue Hearts~U.S.A. Tour 1990 is apparently a different video documenting the USA tour. Note the difference in the title.  Meet the Blue Hearts was produced as a promotional video before the USA album release and US Tour. It aired on MTV as a special. 

The Video  Meet the Blue Hearts  included
Train Train
Kise shi te ho shi ti (sp?) ( I want a Kiss)
Love Letter
Linda Linda 
etc

Meet the Blue Hearts~U.S.A. Tour 1990 was a video album produced by the Japanese band The Blue Hearts as a documentary of their tour of America in 1991. The tour shares a name with the band's first compilation album, Meet the Blue Hearts, but there is no other relation between the two.

Songs
The following songs are included on the video. Only The Blue Hearts Theme and Blue Sky were included on the Blast Off!, the album released in America by the band the following year.
""
"Be Kind to People" (人にやさしく Hito ni Yasashiku)
"Linda Linda" (リンダリンダ Rinda Rinda)
"Blue Sky" (青空 Aosora)

References

The Blue Hearts video albums
1990 live albums
Live video albums
1990 video albums